Cirrothauma murrayi, the blind cirrate octopus, is a nearly blind octopus whose eyes can sense light, but not form images. It has been found worldwide, usually  beneath the ocean's surface. Like other cirrates, it has an internal shell, muscular fins for swimming, and a web connecting the arms.

The species was first caught by an expedition led by Sir John Murray in 1910, and it was later named in honor of Murray. It was described by German marine biologist Carl Chun in 1911.

The large buccal mass, esophagus, and stomach of the Cirrothauma Murrayi strongly suggest whole organisms, especially crustaceans, are part of its diet. The enzymatic action of salivary excretions separates the crustacean's musculoskeletal attachments and allows for the tissue to be removed, leaving the exoskeleton of the crustacean undamaged.

Description

Eye structure
The eye structure is very different from other octopods. Their eyes are small, lens-less and almost non-functional, as the eyes also lack irises and ciliary bodies. The nearly sightless eyes are embedded deep in the gelatinous tissue of their head.

Suckers
Cirrothauma murrayi has about six strong sessile suckers which help them swim as well as hunt fish.

References

Bibliography

 

Octopuses
Taxa named by Carl Chun
Molluscs described in 1911